Bartholomäus Ringwaldt (c. 1530 – probably May 9, 1599) was a German didactic poet and Lutheran pastor. He is most recognized as a hymnwriter.

Biography
Bartholomäus Ringwaldt was born in Frankfort-on-the-Oder, Germany. From 1543, he studied theology. After graduating, he first started his career as a teacher. He was ordained into the Lutheran Ministry during 1557 and served as pastor of two parishes. In 1566, he became  the pastor of Langenfeld, Neumark. Starting during the 1570s, he wrote songs and poems which focused on his religious and theological beliefs. Ringwaldt was a prolific hymnist, and may have composed tunes as well.

Bartholomäus Ringwaldt died probably May 9, 1599 in Langenfeld, today Długoszyn near Sulęcin, Poland.

Hymns
Ringwaldt's hymns include:
 "Herr Jesu Christ, du höchstes Gut" ("Lord Jesus Christ, you highest good"). As well as writing the words, Ringwaldt may have written the anonymous tune. This chorale is the basis for Johann Sebastian Bach's chorale cantata Herr Jesu Christ, du höchstes Gut, BWV 113 (1724).
 "Herr Jesu Christ, ich weiß gar wohl" ("Lord Jesus Christ, I know very well").
 "Gott Heil'ger Geist, hilf uns mit Grund" (1581), translated into English as O Holy Spirit, grant us grace by Oluf H. Smeby for "The Lutheran Hymnal", 1909
 "Es ist gewisslich an der Zeit" (ca, 1565), translated into English as The day is surely drawing near  by Philip A. Peter for the "Ohio Lutheran Hymnal", 1880.

References

Other sources
Julian, John  (1892) A Dictionary of Hymnology  (New York: Charles Scribner's Sons)

External links
Bartholomäus Ringwaldt  (Wikisource)

1530s births
1599 deaths
German Lutheran hymnwriters
16th-century German Lutheran clergy
German poets
People from Frankfurt (Oder)
German male non-fiction writers
16th-century hymnwriters